

Distribution

References

4